Below is a list of newspapers  published at some point in Turks and Caicos Islands.

Weekly
Turks and Caicos Free Press
Turks and Caicos SUN
Turks and Caicos Weekly News

Newspapers
Turks and Caicos Islands